Pinki Singh may refer to:
 Pinki Singh Yadav, Indian politician
 Pinki Singh (bowls)